This is a listing of the horses that finished in either first, second, or third place and the number of starters in the Maryland Sprint Handicap, an American graded stakes race run on dirt over six furlongs at Pimlico Race Course  in Baltimore, Maryland.

References 

Pimlico Race Course